Refshauge is a surname. Notable people with the surname include:

 Andrew Refshauge (born 1949), Australian politician
 Joan Refshauge (1906–1979), Australian doctor and schoolteacher
 Richard Refshauge (born 1947), Australian lawyer and judge
 William Refshauge (1913–2009), Australian soldier and public administrator

Danish-language surnames